Mentha satureioides, commonly known as native pennyroyal or creeping mint, is a species of herbaceous perennial native to southern + eastern Australia (Queensland, New South Wales, Victoria, South Australia). It was first described by prolific botanist Robert Brown in 1810.

References

Plants described in 1810
satureioides
Flora of Australia